CCIR System M, sometimes called 525–line, monochrome NTSC, NTSC-M, or CCIR-M, is the analog broadcast television system approved by the FCC (upon recommendation by the National Television Systems Committee - NTSC) for use in the United States since July 1, 1941, replacing the 441-line TV system introduced in 1938. System M displays a total of 525 lines of video (with 480 carrying visible image information) at 30 frames per second using 6 MHz spacing between channel numbers, and is used for both VHF and UHF channels. Video is amplitude modulated.

It was also adopted in most of the Americas and Caribbean, South Korea, Taiwan and Japan (here with minor differences, informally referred to as System J).  System M doesn't specify a color system, but NTSC (NTSC-M) was normally used, with some exceptions: NTSC-J in Japan, PAL-M in Brazil and SECAM-M on Cambodia and Vietnam (see Color standards section below).

The letter M designation was attributed by the ITU on the 1961 Stockholm meeting (see  ITU identification scheme).

Since 2015, System M is being replaced by digital broadcasting, in countries such as the Americas, Japan, South Korea, Taiwan and the Philippines.

Specifications

Color standards

NTSC-M and NTSC-J

Strictly speaking, System M does not designate how color is transmitted.  However, in nearly every System M country NTSC is used for color television. This combination called is called NTSC-M, but usually simply referred to as  "NTSC", because of the relative lack of importance of black-and-white television. In NTSC-M and Japan's NTSC-J, the frame rate is offset slightly, becoming  frames per second, usually labeled as the rounded number 29.97.

PAL-M

The main exception to System M's being paired with NTSC color is Brazil, where PAL color is used instead, resulting in the PAL-M combination unique to that country. It is monochrome-compatible with other System M countries, but not compatible with other PAL countries, which use 625-line based systems.

SECAM-M

Between 1970 and 1991 a variation of the SECAM color system, known as SECAM-M, was used in Cambodia and Vietnam (Hanoi and other northern cities).

References

See also
 NTSC — dominant color system used with System M, so much so that System M is often referred to as "NTSC".  Much of the information in the NTSC article is actually about System M.
 Broadcast television systems — explains other types of television system standards
 Multichannel television sound — usual method for adding stereo to System M audio

Telecommunications-related introductions in 1941
ITU-R recommendations
Television technology
M, System
CCIR System